Little Tough Guys in Society is a 1938 Universal Studios film that starred several of the Dead End Kids.  It was the second film that Universal made in their series and the first of three that they made without any of the original Dead End Kids.

Plot
Mrs. Berry, a socialite, hires a psychiatrist to care for her son Randolph.  He exhibits antisocial behavior and stays bedridden all day.  The doctor determines that if he was exposed to other boys of a lesser social stature he will break out of his shell and resume his place in society.  They contact a place in the city and hire six underprivileged kids to come out to the country to help out.  The boys who arrive are not the boys who were originally hired, but a gang of misfits who are wanted for destroying a glass factory.  They quickly help Randolph overcome his antisocial behavior and assist in capturing some thieves who broke into Mrs. Berry's residence while Randolph's birthday party was taking place.  The boys are then discovered to be on the run from the police, but with the assistance of a judge attending the party, they surrender and agree to return to New York and face their punishment.

Cast

The Little Tough Guys
 Frankie Thomas as Danny
 Harris Berger as Sailor
 Hally Chester as Murphy
 Charles Duncan as Monk
 David Gorcey as Yap
 William Benedict as Trouble

Additional Cast
 Mischa Auer as Dr. Trenkle
 Mary Boland as Mrs. Berry
 Edward Everett Horton as Oliver
 Helen Parrish as Penny
 Jackie Searl as Randolf Berry
 Peggy Stewart as Jane
 Harold Huber as Uncle Buck
 David Oliver as Footman
 Stanley Blystone as Policeman
 Eddie Hall as Cabbie
 Samuel S. Hinds as Judge
 Lon McCallister as unnamed
 Sarah Padden as Victim
 Frances Robinson as Guest
 Dick Rush as Jim

The writers
The writers Mortimer Offner and Edward Eliscu were related by marriage. Eliscu's wife Stella Bloch was Mortimer's cousin. Eliscu and Offner were both eventually blacklisted.

References

External links 

1938 films
American black-and-white films
Universal Pictures films
Films directed by Erle C. Kenton
American comedy films
1938 comedy films
1930s English-language films
1930s American films